The 1946 Italian presidential election was undertaken to elect a provisional head of the Italian State on 28 June 1946.

Background
After the departure of former King Umberto II of Italy on 13 June 1946, following the abolition of the monarchy, the functions of head of state had provisionally been exercised by Prime Minister Alcide De Gasperi, to which he was entrusted until the beginning of July when, following election as Provisional Head of State, Enrico De Nicola was sworn in before the Constituent Assembly as president.
 
They are not considered presidential elections, as this institution did not yet exist. However, De Nicola assumed this title according to the first transitional provision of the Constitution in 1948.

Result

Notes

Presidential elections in Italy